The 2016 CAF Confederation Cup (officially the 2016 Orange CAF Confederation Cup for sponsorship reasons) was the 13th edition of the CAF Confederation Cup, Africa's secondary club football competition organized by the Confederation of African Football (CAF).

TP Mazembe defeated MO Béjaïa in the final to win their first CAF Confederation Cup title, and earned the right to play against the winners of the 2016 CAF Champions League in the 2017 CAF Super Cup. Étoile du Sahel were the defending champions, and after qualifying for the 2016 CAF Champions League, they entered the 2016 CAF Confederation Cup after they lost in the Champions League second round, but were eliminated in the semi-finals.

Association team allocation
All 56 CAF member associations might enter the CAF Champions League, with the 12 highest ranked associations according to their CAF 5-Year Ranking eligible to enter two teams in the competition. The title holders could also enter. As a result, theoretically a maximum of 69 teams could enter the tournament (plus eight teams eliminated from the CAF Champions League which enter the play-off round) – although this level had never been reached.

For the 2016 CAF Confederation Cup, the CAF used the 2010–2014 CAF 5-Year Ranking, which calculates points for each entrant association based on their clubs’ performance over those 5 years in the CAF Champions League and CAF Confederation Cup. The criteria for points are the following:

The points are multiplied by a coefficient according to the year as follows:
2014 – 5
2013 – 4
2012 – 3
2011 – 2
2010 – 1

Teams
The following 59 teams from 39 associations entered the competition.

Teams in bold received a bye to the first round. The other teams entered the preliminary round.

Associations are shown according to their 2010–2014 CAF 5-Year Ranking – those with a ranking score have their rank and score indicated.

Notably two team take part in the competition that do not currently play in their national top-division. They are Barrack Young Controllers II (2nd tier) and Génération Foot (2nd).

Schedule
The schedule of the competition was as follows. For the first time, some rounds of matches were officially scheduled in midweek (in italics) instead of on weekends.

Qualifying rounds

Preliminary round

Notes

First round

Second round

Play-off round

Notes

Group stage

Group A

Group B

Knockout stage

Bracket

Semi-finals

Final

Top goalscorers

See also
2016 CAF Champions League
2017 CAF Super Cup

References

External links
Orange CAF Confederation Cup 2016, CAFonline.com

 
2016
2